Mappa may refer to:

 Mappa (genus), a large genus of Old World tropical trees
 MAPPA, a Japanese animation studio
 Mappa Hall, a historic home in Oneida County, New York, owned by Adam Gerard Mappa a Dutch patriot
 Mappa mundi, Medieval European maps of the world
 Multi-Agency Public Protection Arrangement, arrangements in England and Wales for the management of sexual and violent offenders
 Mappa (Roman), the flag used by Roman consuls to start the horse races at the Ancient Roman hippodrome

See also
 Mapa (disambiguation)